Asterophysus batrachus, the gulper catfish or ogre catfish, is a species of catfish (order Siluriformes) of the family Auchenipteridae. It is native to the Rio Negro and Orinoco  basins in Brazil, Colombia and Venezuela, where mostly found in slow-moving waters with many submerged structures.

It has a short, thick-set shape and is dark-colored with a whitish belly. People in its native range typically will not eat it because they consider it very ugly, but it is sometimes kept in aquariums.

Feeding
The gulper catfish is a strict carnivore and swallows its prey, mostly other fish, whole. This prey can be exceptionally large for its size, sometimes even larger than the gulper catfish itself, although such feeding attempts can be unsuccessful. The catfish catches prey by biting on the head. Escaping out of the mouth is generally prevented by the fine, backwards-pointing teeth of the catfish. Instead the struggles of the prey cause it to be further engulfed and eventually ending up folded (with both its head and tail pointing towards the predator's head) in the greatly extendable gulper catfish stomach. The fully extended stomach may result in an abnormal appearance of the gulper catfish to the point where its swimming can be impaired. It may also swallow large amounts of water only to expel it later along with remains of earlier prey.

Potential prey fish are apparently unable to recognize the gulper catfish as dangerous because fish will not generally consider other fish of roughly similar size as a major threat, and because of its slow, unobtrusive approach. A common observed attack is the catfish quickly turning to the side and biting on the head of the targeted fish. Even if the first attempt fails, the gulper catfish will not try to pursue it. The prey will typically still not realize that the catfish represents a threat and can be caught using the same approach. Another method of catching prey was observed by a snorkeler in the Atabapo River. Here the gulper catfish live in crevices between rocks and dart out to catch passing prey such as angelfish. In aquariums gulper catfish will feed during both day and night, but it is suspected the species is nocturnal and crepuscular in the wild, giving it an additional advantage when hunting along river banks for its often sleeping prey.

References

Auchenipteridae
Catfish of South America
Freshwater fish of Brazil
Freshwater fish of Colombia
Fish of Venezuela
Fish described in 1857
Taxa named by Rudolf Kner